Duncan James Jones (born 18 September 1978 in Neath and brought up in Blaengwynfi, Port Talbot) is a former Welsh rugby union player who played at loose head prop for the Ospreys in the Pro12 and has played for Wales.

Career

First-class career

Jones was educated at Cymer Afan Comprehensive School and Neath College. He has represented Wales at every level from Schools up to the national side, including the Grand Slam-winning Under-21 side of 1999. Jones played at both loosehead and tighthead at school level. During the early part of his professional career with Neath he played at tighthead but switched to loosehead in 2001.

He made his first-class debut for Neath RFC in 1999 and played for the club until the end of the 2002–03 season, when, following a reorganisation of Welsh rugby, Jones transferred to what was then the Neath-Swansea Ospreys. He made his debut for the Ospreys on 10 January 2004. However he was soon followed by Adam Jones who made his first appearance for Ospreys on 13 March 2004 against Stade Toulousain.

In 2005–06, Duncan Jones took over as captain of the Ospreys, following an injury to Barry Williams, and he was appointed captain for the 2006–07 season, during which he led the team to the Celtic League title.

International career
He made his debut for Wales on 25 November 2001, coming on as a substitute in the Autumn International against .

He returned from injury in time to start three games in the 2004 Six Nations Championship; he also started in both Tests against  and came on as a replacement against  on Wales's mid-year tour.

Jones played in the 2004 Autumn Internationals but a dislocated thumb, sustained during a Heineken Cup match between the Ospreys and Munster in January 2005, meant that he was unavailable for the 2005 Six Nations Championship, in which Wales achieved the Grand Slam.

In 2005–06, Jones started in all but one of Wales's Autumn Internationals (he missed the game against ) and in all their 2006 Six Nations Championship matches, following which he was chosen by new coach Gareth Jenkins to captain the side during a mid-year two-Test tour of Argentina. In October 2006, Jenkins appointed Stephen Jones to captain Wales through to the 2007 Rugby World Cup, but when Stephen Jones was rested for the Autumn International against the Pacific Islanders, Duncan Jones returned to captain Wales at home for the first time. He played, as starter or substitute, in all four Autumn Internationals and all five matches in the 2007 Six Nations Championship, but was rested for the mid-year tour to Australia.

Jones was named in the Welsh squad for the 2007 World Cup, and started in the warm-up games against Argentina and France, but though he played in all four pool games during the tournament, he only started in one game, against .

Skills

Although "not the biggest guy" for a prop, Jones makes up for his perceived lack of size with speed, mobility and ball-handling skills that would not disgrace a back. As well as being a good ball-carrier, he is also solid in the scrum and a hard-working defensive tackler.

On the field, Jones is instantly recognisable because of his long curly blond hair. His previous Ospreys and Wales front-row partner Adam Jones is equally recognisable by his shaggy dark hair and the two props were popularly known as the "Hair Bears".

References

External links

Ospreys profile
Wales profile
Six Nations profile

1978 births
Living people
Ospreys (rugby union) players
Rugby union players from Port Talbot
Rugby union props
Wales international rugby union players
Wales rugby union captains
Welsh rugby union players
Neath RFC players